Malkia is a kibbutz in northern Israel. Located near the Lebanese border and Kiryat Shmona, it falls under the jurisdiction of Upper Galilee Regional Council.

History
The village was established in March 1949 by six former Palmach soldiers who had been demobilised at the end of the 1948 Arab-Israeli War. Located on the sites of the depopulated Palestinian villages of Qadas and al-Malkiyya, it was named after al-Malkiyya, a holdover name from the biblical village of Malkia, itself the name of a priestly family from biblical times (Nehemiah 10:4) that settled here, on whose lands it was established.

Notable residents
Micha Bar-Am

See also
Kedesh

References

External links
Kibbutz website

Kibbutzim
Kibbutz Movement
Populated places established in 1949
Populated places in Northern District (Israel)
1949 establishments in Israel